Allan Mason (2 May 1921, – 22 March 2006) was an English first-class cricketer, who played eighteen times for Yorkshire between 1947 and 1950.  A slow left arm bowler, he took 51 wickets at 28.88, with a best of 5 for 56 against Northamptonshire, his only five-wicket haul.

A right-handed batsman, he scored 105 runs at 6.56, with a top score of 22 against Sussex. He also held six catches.

He played for the Yorkshire Second XI from 1939 to 1950.

References

External links
Cricinfo Profile
Cricket Archive Statistics

1921 births
English cricketers
Yorkshire cricketers
People from Ilkley
2006 deaths
Cricketers from Yorkshire